Botanical Heights is a neighborhood of St. Louis, Missouri.  Its former name was McRee Town.  The Botanical Heights neighborhood is defined by Chouteau Avenue on the North, Interstate 44 on the South, 39th Street on the East and Vandeventer Avenue on the West. This near Southside neighborhood is located just north of the Shaw neighborhood.

Demographics

In 2020 Botanical Heights' population was 50.0% Black, 37.2% White, 0.3% Native American, 3.3% Asian, 7.3% Two or More Races, and 1.6% Some Other Race. 5.0% of the neighborhood's population was of Hispanic or Latino origin, 20.3% have a High school education.

See also
Grand Boulevard, nearby major road and commercial area to the east
The Grove, an up-and-coming business and nightlife district to the west
Missouri Botanical Garden
Midtown St. Louis, the nearby area

References

Neighborhoods in St. Louis